Francisco Diaz-Silveira Lopez (October 4, 1908 in Havana, Cuba – April 1996 in Miami, Florida), was a prominent Abogado-Notario (Attorney-Notary) in Havana, Cuba from the 1930s. until the Cuban Revolution of 1959.

He was the son of Francisco Diaz-Silveira and Dolores Lopez. He was married to Ana Gloria Tamargo-Sanchez (May 5, 1910 – May 1996)(they divorced and neither ever remarried) and they had three children, Ana Gloria, Jorge, and Francisco Diaz-Silveira Tamargo.

References
 Nueva Historia de la Republica de Cuba 1898-1979, Herminio Portell-Vila (Miami, Florida: La Moderna Poesia, Inc., 1996)
 Anuario Social de La Habana 1939, Julio de Cespedes & Miguel Baguer, editors (Havana, Cuba: Luz-Hilo, S.A., 1939) 
 Directorio Social de la Habana 1948, Maria R. de Fontanills & Eduardo Fontanills Jr., editors (Havana, Cuba: P. Fernandez y Cia., S. en C., 1948) 
 Libro de Oro de la Sociedad Habanera 1949, Joaquin de Posada, Eduardo Cidre & Pablo Alvarez de Canas, editors (Havana, Cuba: Editorial Lex, 1949) 
 Libro de Oro de la Sociedad Habanera 1950, Joaquin de Posada, Eduardo Cidre & Pablo Alvarez de Canas, editors (Havana, Cuba: Editorial Lex, 1950) 
 Libro de Oro de la Sociedad Habanera 1953, Joaquin de Posada & Pablo Alvarez de Canas, editors (Havana, Cuba: Editorial Lex, 1953) 
 Registro Social de la Habana 1955, Julio de Cespedes, editor (Havana, Cuba: Molina y Cia., S.A., 1955) 
 Registro Social de la Habana 1958, Julio de Cespedes, editor (Havana, Cuba: Molina y Cia., S.A., 1958) 
 Anuario de Familias Cubanas 1988, Joaquin de Posada, editor (Costa Rica: Trejos Hermanos Sucrs., Inc., 1988) 

Exiles of the Cuban Revolution in the United States
Opposition to Fidel Castro
1908 births
1996 deaths
Cuban emigrants to the United States
20th-century Cuban lawyers